Peter Trachtenberg (born 1953) is an American writer of fiction, nonfiction, and memoir.

Life
He graduated from Sarah Lawrence College, and from City College of New York with an MA.
He is an Associate Professor of Creative Writing in the Department of English at the University of Pittsburgh. and a member of the core faculty of the Bennington Writing Seminars.

His work has appeared in The New Yorker, Harper's, BOMB, TriQuarterly, O, The New York Times Travel Magazine, and A Public Space.

In 2001, he married writer Mary Gaitskill. They divorced in 2010.

Awards

2010 Guggenheim Fellowship
 2007 Whiting Award
 1984 Nelson Algren Award

Works

Books

Anthologies

Stories and articles
"You're Fired: Cloudburst", The New Yorker, April 21, 2003.
"The Chattering Masses", The New Yorker, May 15, 2005.
"Why Obama?", Largehearted Boy, October 2, 2008
"Dan P. Lee and Travis the killer chimp", Nieman Storyboard, December 4, 2012
"Tomorrow and Tomorrow", Kenyon Review Online, Summer 2013
"Madame Bovary: Before Country Was Cool", Modern Farmer, October 9, 2014
"Inside the Tiger Factory", Virginia Quarterly Review, Summer 2015

References

External links
Author's website
Profile at The Whiting Foundation
Blue Flowers Arts
Hachette Book Group

American non-fiction writers
1953 births
University of Pittsburgh faculty
Living people